Megachile parietina is a species of bee in the family Megachilidae. It was described by Geoffroy in 1785.  It is native to most of central Europe, as well as parts of eastern Europe.

References

External links

Parietina
Insects described in 1785